The 2016 Miami RedHawks football team represented Miami University in the 2016 NCAA Division I FBS football season. They were led by third-year head coach Chuck Martin, played their home games at Yager Stadium, and competed as a member of the East Division of the Mid-American Conference. They finished the season 6–7, 6–2 in MAC play to finish in a tie for the East Division championship with Ohio. Due to their head-to-head loss to Ohio, they did not represent the East Division in the MAC Championship Game. They were invited to the St. Petersburg Bowl where they lost to Mississippi State.

Miami became the first team in FBS history to start the regular season 0–6 and finish the regular season at 6–6.

Schedule

Game summaries

at Iowa

Eastern Illinois

WKU

at Cincinnati

Ohio

at Akron

Kent State

at Bowling Green

at Eastern Michigan

Central Michigan

at Buffalo

Ball State

Mississippi State–St. Petersburg Bowl

References

Miami
Miami RedHawks football seasons
Miami RedHawks football